Milton Frome (February 24, 1909 – March 21, 1989) was an American character actor.

Career
Born in Philadelphia, Pennsylvania, Frome landed his first acting job in the short subject Daredevil O'Dare in 1934. He did not act again until 1939 when he joined the cast of Ride 'Em Cowgirl as Oliver Sheahe.

His acting career stalled until 1950, when he began to find steady work appearing on television shows like I Love Lucy, Adventures of Superman and Lassie. He also worked with The Three Stooges during their final years in the Columbia Pictures short subject department, appearing in the films Pies and Guys and Quiz Whizz.

Frome was very busy in the 1960s, concentrating mainly on character acting roles for television. He also appeared as a comic foil in many Jerry Lewis films.  He covered all types, ranging from hapless souls and college professors to heavies, salesmen, and policemen. Frome could be seen on such shows as Hennesey, The Lawless Years, 77 Sunset Strip, The Dick Van Dyke Show, Bat Masterson, The New Phil Silvers Show, The Addams Family, Batman, Adam-12, Bewitched, Adventures of Superman (TV series),  The Beverly Hillbillies, The Monkees, and A Touch of Grace.

Death
Frome continued acting until 1977, his last role being in the made-for-television remake of the film Captains Courageous. He died of congestive heart failure on March 21, 1989, aged 80, and was buried in Forest Lawn – Hollywood Hills Cemetery.

Filmography

Ride 'em, Cowgirl (1939) – Oliver Shea
Dick Tracy's G-Men (1939) – Officer (uncredited)
Calling All Marines (1939) – Hospital Corpsman (uncredited)
The Seven Little Foys (1955) – Driscoll (uncredited)
You're Never Too Young (1955) – Lieutenant O'Malley
The Birds and the Bees (1956) – Assistant Butler
The Man Who Knew Too Much (1956) – Guard (uncredited)
Pardners (1956) – Hawkins, the Butler
The Girl Can't Help It (1956) – Nick (uncredited)
Public Pigeon No. 1 (1957) – Avery
The Wayward Bus (1957) – Stanton (uncredited)
The Delicate Delinquent (1957) – Mr. Herman
The Lonely Man (1957) – Bixby (uncredited)
The Fuzzy Pink Nightgown (1957) – Police Lieutenant Dempsey
Short Cut to Hell (1957) – LAPD Captain (uncredited)
Hear Me Good (1957) – Mr. Ross
Sing, Boy, Sing (1958) – Man at Recording Studio (uncredited)
The Young Lions (1958) – Draft Board Physician (uncredited)
Go, Johnny, Go! (1959) – Mr. Martin
Visit to a Small Planet (1960) – Police Commissioner
Please Don't Eat the Daisies (1960) – Gus (uncredited)
Cinderfella (1960) – Butler (uncredited)
The Police Dog Story (1961) – Todd Wellman
All Hands on Deck (1961) – Officer with Damaged Car (uncredited)
The Errand Boy (1961) – Mr. Greenback
It's Only Money (1962) – Cop at Pier
Bye Bye Birdie (1963) – Mr. Maude
The Nutty Professor (1963) – Dr. M. Sheppard Leevee
A Ticklish Affair (1963) – Fireman
Who's Minding the Store? (1963) – Francois, the Driver
What a Way to Go! (1964) – Lawyer (uncredited)
I'd Rather Be Rich (1964) – Max
The Disorderly Orderly (1964) – Board Member
John Goldfarb, Please Come Home! (1965) – Air Force General
Girl Happy (1965) – Police Captain (uncredited)
Fluffy (1965) – Tweedy Physicist
The Family Jewels (1965) – Pilot
Dr. Goldfoot and the Bikini Machine (1965) – Motorcycle Cop
Batman (1966) – Vice Admiral Fangschliester
Way... Way Out (1966) – American Delegate
The Swinger (1966) – Mr. Olsson
Enter Laughing (1967) – Policeman
The St. Valentine's Day Massacre (1967) – Adam Heyer
Chubasco (1968) – Police Sergeant
With Six You Get Eggroll (1968) – Bud Young
Which Way to the Front? (1970) – Mr. Fennick – Executive (uncredited)
Adam 12(1972) - Milton Sawyer
The Strongest Man in the World (1975) – Mr. Lufkin
Next Stop, Greenwich Village (1976) – Drugstore Customer (uncredited)
Gus (1976) – Lukom
The Shaggy D.A. (1976) – Auctioneer
Beyond Reason (1977) – Cyril (final film role)

References

External links

1909 births
1989 deaths
American male film actors
American male television actors
Male actors from Philadelphia
Burials at Forest Lawn Memorial Park (Hollywood Hills)
20th-century American male actors